The Logan Thunder was an Australian professional women's basketball team competing in the Women's National Basketball League (WNBL). The team was based in Logan, Queensland.

History 

The Logan Thunder started in 2008 replacing New Zealand-based team Christchurch Sirens. They were the first team to represent South East Queensland in over 10 years. Thunder withdrew from the 2014/15 WNBL season due to financial difficulties and the team later folded.

See also

References

External links
 Official WNBL website
 Logan Thunder official website

Defunct Women's National Basketball League teams
Basketball teams in Queensland
Logan Thunder
Basketball teams established in 2008
Logan City
Articles containing video clips
Basketball teams disestablished in 2014
2008 establishments in Australia
2014 disestablishments in Australia